Anne Matthews is a college lecturer and author of articles and books with  environmental and academic themes. Her book, Where the Buffalo Roam: Restoring America's Great Plains was a 1993 Pulitzer Prize finalist in nonfiction. Deep Creek, written with William Howarth under the joint pen name "Dana Hand", was selected by The Washington Post as one of the best novels of 2010. Matthews is also the author of Bright College Years: Inside the American College Today, and Wild Nights: Nature Returns to the City.

Matthews served on the Library of America editorial board for the two-volume collection Reporting World War II,  and she is a contributing editor for The American Scholar. She has served on the faculties of  Princeton,  Columbia, and New York University, and she was the first woman to direct the Princeton Writing Program. Her various articles and reviews have appeared in The New York Times,  Outside,  Orion,  Preservation, and The Best American Science and Nature Writing.

References

External links

 The New York Times ""Bright College Years: Inside the American College Today"
 The Washington Post "Book World: Carolyn See Reviews "Deep Creek" by Dana Hand." Friday, Feb 26, 2010.

Living people
Year of birth missing (living people)
American non-fiction environmental writers
American environmentalists
American women environmentalists
American women non-fiction writers
21st-century American women